The Goldman–Hodgkin–Katz voltage equation, sometimes called the Goldman equation, is used in cell membrane physiology to determine the reversal potential across a cell's membrane, taking into account all of the ions that are permeant through that membrane.

The discoverers of this are David E. Goldman of Columbia University, and the Medicine Nobel laureates Alan Lloyd Hodgkin and Bernard Katz.

Equation for monovalent ions
The GHK voltage equation for  monovalent positive ionic species and  negative:

This results in the following if we consider a membrane separating two -solutions:

It is "Nernst-like" but has a term for each permeant ion:

 = the membrane potential (in volts, equivalent to joules per coulomb)
 = the selectivity for that ion (in meters per second)
 = the extracellular concentration of that ion (in moles per cubic meter, to match the other  SI units)
 = the intracellular concentration of that ion (in moles per cubic meter)
 = the ideal gas constant (joules per kelvin per mole)
 = the temperature in kelvins
 = Faraday's constant (coulombs per mole)

 is approximately 26.7 mV at human body temperature (37 °C); when factoring in the change-of-base formula between the natural logarithm, ln, and logarithm with base 10 , it becomes , a value often used in neuroscience.

The ionic charge determines the sign of the membrane potential contribution. During an action potential, although the membrane potential changes about 100mV, the concentrations of ions inside and outside the cell do not change significantly. They are always very close to their respective concentrations when the membrane is at their resting potential.

Calculating the first term 

can be reduced to

which is the Nernst equation.

Derivation

Goldman's equation seeks to determine the voltage Em across a membrane.  A Cartesian coordinate system is used to describe the system, with the z direction being perpendicular to the membrane.  Assuming that the system is symmetrical in the x and y directions (around and along the axon, respectively), only the z direction need be considered; thus, the voltage Em is the integral of the z component of the electric field across the membrane.
 
According to Goldman's model, only two factors influence the motion of ions across a permeable membrane: the average electric field and the difference in ionic concentration from one side of the membrane to the other.  The electric field is assumed to be constant across the membrane, so that it can be set equal to Em/L, where L is the thickness of the membrane.  For a given ion denoted A with valence nA, its flux jA—in other words, the number of ions crossing per time and per area of the membrane—is given by the formula

The first term corresponds to Fick's law of diffusion, which gives the flux due to diffusion down the concentration gradient, i.e., from high to low concentration.  The constant DA is the diffusion constant of the ion A.  The second term reflects the flux due to the electric field, which increases linearly with the electric field; Formally, it is [A] multiplied by the drift velocity of the ions, with the drift velocity expressed using the Stokes–Einstein relation applied to electrophoretic mobility. The constants here are the charge valence nA of the ion A (e.g., +1 for K+, +2 for Ca2+ and −1 for Cl−), the temperature T (in kelvins), the molar gas constant R, and the faraday F, which is the total charge of a mole of electrons.

This is a first-order ODE of the form y' = ay + b, with y = [A] and y''' = d[A]/dz; integrating both sides from z=0 to z=L with the boundary conditions [A](0) = [A]in and [A](L) = [A]out, one gets the solution

where μ is a dimensionless number

and PA is the ionic permeability, defined here as

The electric current density JA equals the charge qA of the ion multiplied by the flux jA

Current density has units of (Amperes/m2). Molar flux has units of (mol/(s m2)). Thus, to get current density from molar flux one needs to multiply by Faraday's constant F (Coulombs/mol). F will then cancel from the equation below. Since the valence has already been accounted for above, the charge qA of each ion in the equation above, therefore, should be interpreted as +1 or -1 depending on the polarity of the ion.

There is such a current associated with every type of ion that can cross the membrane; this is because each type of ion would require a distinct membrane potential to balance diffusion, but there can only be one membrane potential.  By assumption, at the Goldman voltage Em, the total current density is zero

(Although the current for each ion type considered here is nonzero, there are other pumps in the membrane, e.g. Na+/K+-ATPase, not considered here which serve to balance each individual ion's current, so that the ion concentrations on either side of the membrane do not change over time in equilibrium.) If all the ions are monovalent—that is, if all the nA equal either +1 or -1—this equation can be written

whose solution is the Goldman equation

where

If divalent ions such as calcium are considered, terms such as e2μ appear, which is the square of e''μ; in this case, the formula for the Goldman equation can be solved using the quadratic formula.

See also
 Bioelectronics
 Cable theory
 GHK current equation
 Hindmarsh–Rose model
 Hodgkin–Huxley model
 Morris–Lecar model
 Nernst equation
 Saltatory conduction

References

External links
 Subthreshold membrane phenomena Includes a well-explained derivation of the Goldman-Hodgkin-Katz equation
 Nernst/Goldman Equation Simulator 
 Goldman-Hodgkin-Katz Equation Calculator
 Nernst/Goldman interactive Java applet The membrane voltage is calculated interactively as the number of ions are changed between the inside and outside of the cell.
 Potential, Impedance, and Rectification in Membranes by Goldman (1943)

Physical chemistry
Electrochemical equations